Apterodontinae ("without winged tooth") is an extinct subfamily of hyainailourid hyaenodonts that lived in Africa and Europe during the late Eocene to middle Oligocene.

Classification and phylogeny

Taxonomy
 Subfamily: †Apterodontinae 
 Genus: †Apterodon 
 †Apterodon altidens 
 †Apterodon gaudryi 
 †Apterodon langebadreae 
 †Apterodon macrognathus 
 †Apterodon rauenbergensis 
 †Apterodon saghensis 
 †Apterodon sp. [Dur At-Talah escarpment, Libya] 
 Genus: †Quasiapterodon 
 †Quasiapterodon minutus

Phylogeny
The phylogenetic relationships of subfamily Apterodontinae are shown in the following cladogram:

See also
 Mammal classification
 Hyainailouridae

References

Hyaenodonts
Cenozoic mammals of Africa
Cenozoic mammals of Europe